The Lord's Taverners is the UK's leading youth cricket and disability sports charity. Its charitable objective is to 'empower and positively impact the lives of young people facing challenges of inequality'.

It was founded in 1950 by a group of actors and BBC employees, led by founding Chairman and member No.1 Martin Boddey, with others including John Mills, Jack Hawkins, John Snagge, Roy Plomley, Gordon Crier, and Brian Johnston. They used to enjoy watching cricket from the Lord's Tavern pub in St John's Wood Road, close by Lord's Cricket Ground.

Their headquarters are located in London, with the support of over 50 regions. The Lord's Taverners also benefits from the fundraising activities of Regional Committees and its 5,000 members, many of them work in sport and entertainment. The list includes Sir Michael Parkinson, Sir Alastair Cook, Sir Andrew Strauss, Greg James, Miles Jupp, Dame Tanni Grey-Thompson, Jonathan Agnew and Mike Gatting.

History 
The charity was formed in the week after the West Indies' victory over England in the second Test Match at Lord's in 1950. Initially, money raised each year was given to the National Playing Fields Association (now known as Fields in Trust whom the Taverners still support) on the recommendation of The Duke of Edinburgh, Patron and 'Twelfth Man' of The Lord's Taverners.

The existence of the Lord's Taverners and the involvement of early members can be broadly summarised by the following:"We've all got professional and sporting interests in common. So why not start a club, based at the beloved old tavern here. We can talk about our work and watch the cricket. And we can try to put a few bob back into the game at the same time."Since its inception, the Lord's Taverners has developed into a membership charity. For the first fifteen years, the NPFA was the sole beneficiary of the Lord's Taverners, with the money all going to cricket projects, mostly for the installation of artificial pitches.

By the time of the first annual dinner in September 1951, the Lord's Taverners had developed a membership programme - mirrored in much of the charity's activities today. Within the first year, the membership included Laurence Olivier, Jack Hawkins, Trevor Howard, Tommy Trinder and Richard Attenborough from the acting world, alongside John Arlott, Brian Johnston, FR Brown, AER Gilligan, RC Roberston-Glasgow, Rex Alston and Sir Pelham Warner from cricket. The mix of business and cricket continues to transcend the core of the charity membership, whilst other sports such as golf are now well represented.

The first official cricket match in the history of the charity was played in August 1953 against Bishops Stortford CC, and Denis Compton scored 36 in one over. Subsequently, celebrity cricket matches emerged and continue to be one of the core fundraising activities of the Taverners. The teams are a mixture of former Test and County cricketers together with stars of stage, screen and sound along with those from other sports. Under the stewardship of former Kent wicketkeeper Derek Ufton, the Taverners hit their first £100,000 target in a season. Since then, and under his successor John Price, the charity now exceeds this figure each year.

From 1972, under Secretary (and later Director) Captain Anthony Swainson RN, the charity's membership expanded through the newly created category of Friends of the Lord's Taverners, whilst the charity expanded geographically outwards from London, developing a series of regional bases. Thus the Taverners turned from a club to a "major charity".

There are now 50 regions, fundraising entities in their own right who collectively raise over £1m per year. The membership change and geographical expansion were accompanied by the development of the Lord's Taverners charitable remit in 1975 (beyond support for the NPFA) when money was first channelled towards providing recreation for young people with disabilities. This new programme initially focused on the provision of the 'trademark' green minibuses which provide recreational opportunities for organisations looking after young people with special needs. The 1,000th minibus was delivered at the climax of the 2012 cricket season; 2016 is the 40th Anniversary of this provision.

Alongside the provision of minibuses, a programme of providing sporting opportunities (now termed 'Sporting Chances') was developed.

Charitable Programmes 
"I salute the Taverners for what they have done, and are doing, and for their example to future generations" - Donald Bradman.The way money is spent by the Lord's Taverners is constantly under review. The charity works closely with the England and Wales Cricket Board (ECB) who are the charity's principal advisers on how funds to youth cricket should be spent, as well as the MCC, the English Schools Cricket Association and the NPFA. Every year, the Lord's Taverners donates over £3 million to help young people of all abilities and backgrounds participate in sporting activities. In 2015 the Lord's Taverners provided 9.4 million 'sporting chances' for disadvantaged and disabled young people across all of its charitable programmes.

Community cricket 
 Wicketz - a cricket programme that aims to support young people in disadvantaged areas of the UK where clubs provide a safe, structured environment where for young people to enjoy the physical and social benefits of playing cricket while developing life skills.
 Brian Johnston Memorial Trust - a trust fund set up in memory of the late broadcaster Brian Johnston. The trust supports the ECB spin bowling programme, visually impaired young cricketers, and provides scholarships for young male and female cricketers who are in genuine financial need. 
 Girls' Cricket - the Lady Taverners U13 and U15 indoor (schools) and outdoor (clubs) girls' cricket competitions have given over 110,000 girls the opportunity to enjoy competitive cricket providing a framework to play at an informal and more competitive level. Almost half of the current England Women's Squad have developed through the competitions including Heather Knight, Anya Shrubsole and Sarah Taylor. 
 Awards - recognising cricketing achievement by young players. There are three awards for young people under the age of 18: The Centurions Award which recognises a batsman scoring their first hundred; The Five-Fer Award which recognises a player taking their first five-wicket haul; The Captain's Award for someone who has demonstrated great leadership over the course of a season.

Disability cricket 
 Table Cricket - played on a table tennis table, Table Cricket is an adaptive form of cricket enabling young people with physical and learning disabilities to take part in the sport with regional competitions culminating in a finals day every year at the Nursery Pavilion at Lord's Cricket Ground.
 Disability Cricket Championships - the Lord's Taverners Disability Cricket Championships (LTDCC) is a regular year-round competition and coaching programme for 1,000 disabled young people across 16 London boroughs, supported by the Berkeley Foundation.

Grants programmes 
 Accessible Minibuses - providing accessible transport to schools and organisations (specially adapted minibuses) for young people with disabilities since 1976.
 Wheelchair Sports - contributions to the development of junior wheelchair basketball, support for the U19 Boccia Championships, and the donation of sports wheelchairs to disabled young people.
 Disability Play Spaces - providing grants for sensory rooms and equipment and outdoor play spaces for children with severe learning and physical disabilities, sensory impairment and autism.
 Disability Cricket Resources - in partnership with the ECB, investment has been made in a wide range of resources to give support amongst coaches within disability cricket.

Sports Kit Recycling 
The Lord's Taverners kit recycling programme equips UK clubs and developing nations with kit donated by manufacturers, clubs and members of the public.

The Lady Taverners 
The Lady Taverners owe their formation to Baroness Thatcher. Normally each Prime Minister had been made a member of the Lord's Taverners. As a result, the Honorary Lady Taverners were formed and in early 1980 David Evans MP invited Baroness Thatcher to become the first Honorary Lady Taverner.

Baroness Thatcher became a Lady Taverner alongside twenty three other ladies, invited by then Lord's Taverners president Eric Morecambe. They were ladies who had helped at cricket matches and those who had organised a tombola at the President's Ball, including Ann Barrington, Anne Subba Row, Baroness Heyhoe Flint, Marjorie Gover, Judith Chalmers, Betty Surridge and Joan Morecambe.

In 1986 a committee was formed with Anne Subba Row as chairman, and events such as spring and autumn lunches followed. Following the only Honorary Lady Taverners annual general meeting, membership was opened to paying ladies and the first Lady Taverners were elected on 12 October 1987.

The Lady Taverners now have a membership of over 1,000 and draw members from the sporting, show business and corporate worlds.

Governance

The Lord's Taverners Presidents 
 Sir John Mills (1950–1951)
 John Snagge (1952)
 Martin Boddey (1953)
 Jack Hawkins (1954)
 Major A Huskisson (1955)
 Tommy Trinder (1956)
 Stephen Mitchell (1957)
 Sir John Barbirolli (1958)
 Sir Ian Jacob (1959)
 The Duke of Edinburgh (1960–1961)
 Sir Robert Menzies (1962)
 Richard Hearne (1963)
 John Snagge (1964)
 Sir Edward Lewis (1965)
 Ronnie Waldman (1966)
 Sir Harry Secombe (1967–1968)
 Lord Luke of Pavenham (1969)
 Brian Rix, Baron Rix (1970)
 Martin Boddey (1971)
 Victor Silvester (1972)
 Jimmy Edwards (1973)
 Alf Gover (1974)
 The Prince of Wales (1975–1976)
 Eric Morecambe (1977–1979)
 Sir Harry Secombe (1980–1981)
 Ronnie Corbett (1982)
 Sir Terry Wogan (1983–1984)
 Sir David Frost (1985–1986)
 Ronnie Corbett (1987)
 Sir Tim Rice (1988–1990)
 Leslie Crowther (1991–1992)
 The Prince Edward (1993–1994)
 Colin Cowdrey, Baron Cowdrey of Tonbridge (1995–1997)
 Nicholas Parsons (1998–1999)
 Sir Tim Rice (2000)
 Robert Powell (2001–2002)
 Sir Richard Stilgoe (2003–2004)
 Mike Gatting (2005–2007)
 Bill Tidy (2007–2009)
 Chris Tarrant (2009–2011)
 Barry Norman (2011-2012)
 Chris Cowdrey (2012–2015)
 Sir Michael Parkinson (2015–2018)
 Sir Trevor McDonald (2018–2020)
 David Gower (2020–Present)

In 2007 Sir Bobby Robson was to have succeeded Mike Gatting as president, although was unable to do so due to his ill-health. The charity later praised Robson posthumously with a March 2010 formal dinner in aid of the Sir Bobby Robson Foundation, in honour of "The best President we never had".

The Lord's Taverners Chairmen

 Martin Boddey (1950–1952)
 Michael Shepley (1953)
 Stephen Mitchell (1954)
 John Glyn-Jones (1955)
 John Snagge (1956)
 Jack Payne (1958–1959)
 Ronnie Waldman (1959)
 John Snagge (1960–1961)
 Leslie Frewin (1962)
 Roy Rich (1963–1964)
 A C L Bennett (1965–1966)
 Ronnie Waldman (1967)
 Jack Rayfield (1968–1969)
 Ian Carmichael (1970–1971)
 Mark Motho (1972–1973)
 Peter Palmer (1974–1975)
 John Josling (1976–1977)
 Chris Howland (1978–1979)
 Neil Durden-Smith (1980–1981)
 David Evans (1982–1983)
 John Bromley (1984–1985)
 Mervyn Grubb (1986–1987)
 Robin Moors (1988–1989)
 Derek Ufton (1990–1991)
 Brian Baldock (1992–1994)
 Ken Lawrence (1995–1996)
 John Bromley (1997–1999)
 Roger Smith (2000–2001)
 John Ayling (2002–2003)
 Richard Groom (2004–2006)
 Jonathan Rice (2006–2008)
 John Hooper (2008–2010)
 John Ayling (2010–2012)
 Tom Rodwell (2012–2014)
 Roger Smith (2014–2016)
 Martin Smith (2016–2017)
 David Collier (2018–2020)
 Tim Luckhurst (2020–Present)

The Lady Taverners Presidents

 Joan Morecambe (1987-1992)
 Judith Chalmers (1992-2001)
 Rachael Heyhoe Flint (2001–2011)
 Angela Rippon (2011–2016)
 Lesley Garrett (2016–2018)
 Debbie McGee (2018–present)

The Lady Taverners Chairmen
 Anne Subba Row (1985–1986)
 Diana Thomas (1987–1988)
 Maria Moult (1989–1990)
 Wendy Caller (1991–1992)
 Laura Collins (1993–1994)
 Lesley Balls (1995–1996)
 Chrissie Colbeck (acting) (1997–1998)
 Jean Ratcliff (1998–2000)
 Judy Haggas (2000–2002)
 Dulcie Quinnell (2003–2004)
 Annie Peacock (2004–2005)
 Dame Maggie Smith (2006–2008)
 Denise Horne (2008–2010) 
 Sally Surridge (2010–2012)
 Marilyn Fry (2012–2014)
 Carol Robinson (2014–Present)

References

External links
 
 

Cricket culture
Charities based in London
1950 establishments in the United Kingdom